Echium stenosiphon is a plant species of the family Boraginaceae. The species is endemic to Cape Verde. Its local name is língua-de-vaca (cow tongue), a name that may also refer to the related species Echium vulcanorum and Echium hypertropicum. The plant is used in traditional medicinal for a cough syrup.

Distribution and ecology
Echium stenosiphon occurs in the Barlavento islands of Santo Antão, São Nicolau, São Vicente and Santa Luzia. It mainly occurs in the subhumid and humid zones, but has also been reported from the arid zone on São Vicente.

Subspecies
The following subspecies are recognised:

Echium stenosiphon subsp. glabrescens
Echium stenosiphon subsp. lindbergii
Echium stenosiphon subsp. stenosiphon

References

Further reading

''The endemic vascular plants of the Cape Verde Islands, W Africa, Sommerfeltia 24, 1997,  C. Brochmann, Ø. H. Rustan, W. Lobin & N. Kilian, ISSN 0800-6865,  

stenosiphon
Endemic flora of Cape Verde
Flora of Santo Antão, Cape Verde
Flora of São Vicente, Cape Verde
Flora of São Nicolau, Cape Verde